Curtner is a neighborhood of Fremont in Alameda County, California. It was formerly an unincorporated community.

References

Neighborhoods in Fremont, California